The Yair Bridge or Fairnilee Bridge is a bridge across the River Tweed at Yair, near Galashiels in the Scottish Borders.

History

It was built in around 1764, with William Mylne acting as both designer and contractor.

It was listed as a Category A listed building in 1971.

The bridge was substantially rebuilt between 1987 and 1988, with the addition of reinforcing concrete.

Design

It has three arches of  span, and is  clear over the river. The piers and abutments are made from block masonry, and the rest of the structure is made from rubble.

The bridge carries the A707 public road across the River Tweed.

References

External links

Category A listed buildings in the Scottish Borders
Bridges in the Scottish Borders
Bridges across the River Tweed
Bridges completed in 1764
1764 establishments in Scotland